Sanduni Abeywickrema (born 12 December 1982) is a Sri Lankan cricketer who plays for Sri Lanka's women's cricket team. She made her One Day International (ODI) debut against India on 15 December 2006.

References

External links
 

1982 births
Living people
Sri Lankan women cricketers
Sri Lanka women One Day International cricketers
Sri Lanka women Twenty20 International cricketers
Cricketers from Colombo